Stephansplatz may refer to either of the following:
Stephansplatz, Vienna
Stephansplatz station (Vienna U-Bahn)
Stephansplatz, Hamburg
Stephansplatz station (Hamburg U-Bahn)